Talkin' 'Bout Men is the sixth studio album by American country music group The Forester Sisters. It was released in 1991 via Warner Bros. Records. The album peaked at number 16 on the Billboard Top Country Albums chart. Its title comes from the song "Men", which peaked at number 8 on the country singles charts.

Critical reception
Johnny Loftus reviewed the album with favor on AllMusic, calling "Men" a "novelty hit" and "Bonnie Raitt-lite country pop number", also finding influences of Western swing and gospel in some tracks while simultaneously complimenting the sisters' harmonies.

Track listing

Personnel 
Adapted from Talkin' 'Bout Men liner notes.

The Forester Sisters
 Christy Forester – vocals
 June Forester – vocals
 Kathy Forester – vocals
 Kim Forester – vocals

Musicians
 Clayton Ivey – keyboards
 Steve Nathan – keyboards
 Hargus "Pig" Robbins – keyboards
 Robert Byrne – electric guitar, acoustic guitar
 Bill Hinds – electric guitar
 Billy Joe Walker Jr. – acoustic guitar
 John Willis – electric guitar
 Bruce Bouton – steel guitar, dobro
 Larry Paxton – bass guitar
 Michael Rhodes - bass guitar
 Bob Wray – bass guitar
 Owen Hale – drums
 Rob Hajacos – fiddle
 Guy Higginbotham – saxophone

Technical
 Richard Helm – A&R direction 
 Robert Byrne – producer, mixing, mastering
 Alan Schulman – producer, engineer, mixing, mastering
 Rok Campbell – assistant engineer
 Jonathan Grimm – assistant engineer
 Pat Hutchinson – assistant engineer
 Daniel Johnston – assistant engineer
 Vicki Lancaster – assistant engineer
 Steve Lowery – assistant engineer
 Ed Turner – assistant engineer
 Hollis Flatt – mastering
 M.C. Rather – mastering
 Custom Mastering (Nashville, Tennessee) – mastering location 
 Laura LiPuma – art direction, design 
 Mark Tucker – photography 
 Judy Seale and Refugee Management, Inc. – management

Charts

Weekly charts

Year-end charts

References

1991 albums
The Forester Sisters albums
Warner Records albums
Albums produced by Robert Byrne (songwriter)